Platepistoma is  is a genus of crabs.

Species
Included species:
Platepistoma anaglyptum 
Platepistoma balssii 
Platepistoma guezei 
Platepistoma kiribatiense 
Platepistoma macrophthalmum 
Platepistoma nanum 
Platepistoma seani 
Platepistoma seychellense

References

External links

Cancroidea
Decapod genera